Anson County is a county located in the U.S. state of North Carolina. As of the 2020 census, the population was 22,055.  Its county seat is Wadesboro.

History
The county was formed in 1750 from Bladen County. It was named for George Anson, Baron Anson, a British admiral, who circumnavigated the globe from 1740 to 1744, and later became First Lord of the Admiralty. Anson purchased land in the state.

Like its parent county Bladen being occupied by Native American tribes(Waccamaw people), Anson County was originally occupied by Catawba Siouan tribe as a vast territory with indefinite northern and western boundaries.  Reductions to its extent began in 1753, when the northern part of it became Rowan County. In 1762 the western part of Anson County became Mecklenburg County. In 1779 the northern part of what remained of Anson County became Montgomery County, and the part east of the Pee Dee River became Richmond County. Finally, in 1842 the western part of Anson County was combined with the southeastern part of Mecklenburg County to become Union County.

Geography

National protected area
 Pee Dee National Wildlife Refuge (part)

State and local protected areas/sites 
 Arrowhead Lake
 Gaddy Covered Bridge
 Pee Dee River Game Land
 Wadesboro Downtown Historic District

Major water bodies 

 Blewett Falls Lake
 Brown Creek (Pee Dee River tributary)
 Goulds Fork (Brown Creek tributary)
 Great Pee Dee River
 Lanes Creek (Rocky River tributary)
 Pee Dee River
 Rocky River
 Thoroughfare Creek

Adjacent counties
 Stanly County — north
 Montgomery County — northeast
 Richmond County — east
 Chesterfield County, South Carolina — south
 Union County — west

Major highways

Major infrastructure 
 Anson County Airport

Demographics

2020 census

As of the 2020 United States census, there were 22,055 people, 9,521 households, and 5,809 families residing in the county.

2010 census
In the 2010 Census, there were 26,948 people. The racial makeup of the county was 48.58% African American, 47.15% White American, 1.07% Asian, 0.61% Native American, 1.25% multiracial and 1.32% of other race. People of Hispanic and Latino origin account for 3.02% of the population.

2000 census
As of the census of 2000, there were 25,275 people, 9,204 households, and 6,663 families residing in the county.  The population density was 48 people per square mile (18/km2). There were 10,221 housing units at an average density of 19 per square mile (7/km2). The racial makeup of the county was 51.64% Black or African American, 48.53% White, 0.45% Native American, 0.57% Asian, 0.02% Pacific Islander, 0.32% from other races, and 0.46% from two or more races. 0.83% of the population were Hispanic or Latino of any race.

There were 9,204 households, out of which 31.00% had children under the age of 18 living with them, 47.80% were married couples living together, 19.80% had a female householder with no husband present, and 27.60% were non-families. 25.10% of all households were made up of individuals, and 11.00% had someone living alone who was 65 years of age or older. The average household size was 2.59 and the average family size was 3.09.

In the county, the population was spread out, with 25.20% under the age of 18, 8.60% from 18 to 24, 29.00% from 25 to 44, 22.80% from 45 to 64, and 14.40% who were 65 years of age or older. The median age was 37 years. For every 100 females there were 96.50 males. For every 100 females age 18 and over, there were 95.80 males.

The median income for a household in the county was $29,849, and the median income for a family was $35,870. Males had a median income of $27,297 versus $20,537 for females. The per capita income for the county was $14,853. About 15.50% of families and 17.80% of the population were below the poverty line, including 23.90% of those under age 18 and 16.70% of those age 65 or over.

Government and politics
Anson County is a member of the regional Centralina Council of Governments.

Education
There are 11 schools in the Anson County Schools system that serve the students of the county.

South Piedmont Community College has a campus on Highway 74 near Polkton that serves Anson County residents.

Communities

Towns
 Ansonville
 Lilesville
 McFarlan
 Morven
 Peachland
 Polkton
 Wadesboro (county seat and largest town)

Townships
 Ansonville
 Burnsville
 Gulledge
 Lanesboro
 Lilesville
 Morven
 Wadesboro
 White Store

Unincorporated communities
 Burnsville
 Pee Dee

Ghost town
 Sneedsboro

Population ranking
The population ranking of the following table is based on the 2021 Estimates of Anson County.

† county seat

In popular culture
Steven Spielberg filmed The Color Purple mostly in Lilesville, and a large white farmhouse (the Huntley house, which is located in Lilesville, NC and is an old farmhouse located few miles off Highway 74) was used extensively as the main exterior location in that film.

Notable people
 Stephone Anthony (born 1992), linebacker with the New Orleans Saints of the National Football League
 Hugh Hammond Bennett (1881–1960), soil conservation specialist
 John Culpepper (1761–1841), born near Wadesboro, United States Congressman from North Carolina, long-tenured Baptist minister.
 Blind Boy Fuller (1907–1941), American blues guitarist and vocalist.
 James Holland (1754–1823), born in Anson County, United States Congressman from North Carolina.
 Juanita Moody (1924–-2015), born in Morven, NC, gifted cryptographer whose intelligence gathering contributed greatly during the Cuban Missile Crisis.
 Leonidas Lafayette Polk (1837–1892), first North Carolina Commissioner of Agriculture
 Sylvester Ritter (1952–1998), born in Anson County, professional wrestler also known as The Junkyard Dog.

See also
 List of counties in North Carolina
 National Register of Historic Places listings in Anson County, North Carolina
 Anson County Regiment militia in the American Revolution

References

External links

 
 

 
1750 establishments in North Carolina
Populated places established in 1750
Majority-minority counties in North Carolina